Chris Wilson (born 30 December 1967) is a Canadian wrestler. He competed in the men's freestyle 68 kg at the 1992 Summer Olympics.

References

1967 births
Living people
Canadian male sport wrestlers
Olympic wrestlers of Canada
Wrestlers at the 1992 Summer Olympics
Sportspeople from Winnipeg
Commonwealth Games gold medallists for Canada
Commonwealth Games medallists in wrestling
Wrestlers at the 1994 Commonwealth Games
20th-century Canadian people
Medallists at the 1994 Commonwealth Games